California Kickers were a soccer club based in Hollywood, California. They joined the Western Soccer Alliance in 1986. They initially played as Hollywood Kickers before changing their name for the following season. In 1990 the team name was changed again, becoming the California Emperors when they joined the American Professional Soccer League. After the 1991 season, the team left the league to become an amateur club. In 1986 the first year the Kickers held open tryouts for the highest adult level players along with Collegiate players looking to play professional soccer, which was scarce once NASL folded their teams. On this first roster, there were standout local plays like: Martín Vásquez (Cal State LA and former indoor player for LA Lazers), Alberto Bru (Cal State LA player), Steve Singleman (Cal State LA), and Mike Page (Cal State LA), Mike Getchel (UCLA), Paul Krumpe (UCLA), Steve Ledezzma (Simi Valley High School), Rudy Ybarra (Former LA Aztecs and Santa Barbara), Armando Ceja (Cal State LA), Daniel Behrendt (UC Berkeley), Brian Myrdal (Mt. San Antonio) Getulio (Brazilian International player, São Paulo Brazil) Short season and no playoffs the Hollywood Kickers played consistently to win the first title of the Western Soccer Alliance expansion. Their home field was Birmingham High Stadium in Van Nuys California. Coached by Dieter Hochheimer from Germany.

Owners

Jaime Legaspi and Dean Foley ( 1990–2004 )

John Ajemian (1987-1989)

Head coach
 Dieter Hochheimer

Year-by-year

References 

Soccer clubs in Los Angeles
Defunct soccer clubs in California
Western Soccer Alliance teams
Soccer clubs in California
Association football clubs established in 1986
1986 establishments in California